The 1957 Africa Cup of Nations Final was a football match that took place on 16 February 1957 at the Municipal Stadium in Khartoum, Sudan, to determine the winner of the 1957 Africa Cup of Nations, the football championship of Africa organized by the Confederation of African Football (CAF).

Egypt beat Ethiopia 4−0, with all four goals scored by Ad-Diba.

Road to the final

1 The match was scratched and Ethiopia advanced to the final as South Africa were disqualified due to apartheid.

Match details

Details

References

Final
1
African Cup of Nations Final
African
African
May 1957 sports events in Africa
20th century in Khartoum
Sport in Khartoum